John Musto (born 1954) is an American composer and pianist. As a composer, he is active in opera, orchestral and chamber music, song, vocal ensemble, and solo piano works. As a pianist, he performs frequently as a soloist, alone and with orchestra, as a chamber musician, and with singers.

Career
Born in 1954 in Brooklyn, New York, Musto studied at the Manhattan School of Music. After graduation from the conservatory with a reputation as a pianist, his compositions began to draw increasing attention and frequent performances. His long association with such institutions as the New York Festival of Song (including serving as new music advisor), the Wolf Trap Opera Company, the Caramoor Festival, Copland House, the Miller Theatre at Columbia University, and the Moab Festival have given him stable bases of operation and numerous commissions.

He served as composer-in-residence at Caramoor for the 2005-2006 season.

In 1986, he began to build a catalogue of published compositions at Peermusic Classical, which continues to grow steadily.

Personal
In 1984  John Musto married the soprano Amy Burton, a member of the New York City and Metropolitan Opera companies. He often appears with her as pianist in recital, cabaret and on recordings. Their son Joshua was born in 1994.

Worklist

Orchestra

Overture to Pope Joan (1998) full orchestra
Passacaglia (2003) large orchestra
Sinfonietta (2015) chamber orchestra

Piano and orchestra

Piano Concerto 1 (2005) piano solo with full orchestra; premiered at Caramoor with the composer at the piano
Piano Concerto 2 (2005) piano solo with chamber orchestra; premiered at Columbia University with the composer at the piano

Voice and orchestra

Encounters (1992) tenor and full orchestra
Dove Sta Amore (1996) soprano and chamber orchestra
Quiet Songs (orchestrated 2009) soprano and chamber orchestra

Opera

Volpone (2004) comic opera in two acts with a libretto by Mark Campbell, commissioned by Wolf Trap
Later the Same Evening (2007) opera in one act with a libretto by Mark Campbell; premiered at the Glimmerglass Festival, July 2011
Bastianello (2008) comic opera in one act with a libretto by Mark Campbell
The Inspector (2011), comic opera with a libretto by Mark Campbell based on Gogol

Chamber music

Piano Trio (1998) violin, violoncello and piano
Divertimento (1999) flute, clarinet, viola, violoncello, piano and percussion
Clarinet Sextet (2001) clarinet, string quartet and piano
Sonata for Violoncello and Piano (2019)
Sonata for Clarinet and Piano (2020)
Quintet for Piano and String Quartet (2022)

Piano solo

Five Concert Rags (1991-8)
Improvisation and Fugue (2008)

Two pianos

Symphonic Dances from "West Side Story" (arr. 1998)
Passacaglia (arr. 2009)

Transcriptions for Two-Pianos 

 Johann Sebastian Bach: Prelude and Fugue (St. Anne)
 Wolfgang Amadeus Mozart: Overture to The Magic Flute

Vocal chamber music

The Old Gray Couple (1994) soprano, baritone with piano four-hands
The Book of Uncommon Prayer (2001) SATB with piano
River Songs (2002) baritone, violoncello and piano
Another Place (2016) Soprano and String Quartet

Choral

Starsong (1997) SATB, harp and two horns
Five Motets (2001) a capella mixed chorus
Ah, May the Red Rose Live Alway (2016) [arrangement SATB]
...a silence that speaks (2017) a capella mixed chorus

Voice and piano

Two by Frost (1986)
Canzonettas (1984)
Enough Rope (1985)
Shadow of the Blues (1986)
Recuerdo (1988)
Quiet Songs (1990)
Dove Sta Amore (1996)
Penelope (2000)
Viva Sweet Love (2005)
The Brief Light (2010)
Scottish Songs (2013)
Another Place (2016)
Be Music, Night (2017)

Single Songs 
Triolet(1987)
Lament (1988)
Heartbeats (1992)
Flamenco (2000)
I Stop Writing the Poem (2001)
Old Photograph (2001)
San Jose Symphony Reception (2001)
Words To Be Spoken (2001)
Nude at the Piano (2003)
Summer Stars (2012)
Sarah's Song (2012)
Nightsong (2018)

Notes

External links
 Official Site
 Discography
 Peermusic Classical: Publisher Site

1954 births
20th-century classical composers
20th-century classical pianists
21st-century classical composers
21st-century classical pianists
American classical composers
American classical pianists
Male classical pianists
American male pianists
American male classical composers
American opera composers
Male opera composers
Living people
Manhattan School of Music alumni
Musicians from Brooklyn
20th-century American pianists
21st-century American pianists
20th-century American composers
Classical musicians from New York (state)
20th-century American male musicians
21st-century American male musicians